Syncopation is a 1929 American pre-Code musical film directed by Bert Glennon and starring Barbara Bennett, Bobby Watson, and Ian Hunter (although top billing went to Fred Waring and his Pennsylvanians). It was the second film produced by RKO Radio Pictures and the first to be released by the studio; the company's first produced film, Street Girl, was not released until August 1929. The film was made at the company's New York City studios and is based on the novel Stepping High by Gene Markey. The film was heavily marketed on its release, being the first film to be broadcast over the radio, as well as RKO's first sound musical, and was a significant success.

This film was the first made in the RCA Photophone sound-on-film process, and was an important test for Radio Corporation of America, which had invested heavily in the newly-created RKO.

Plot
Benny and Flo are a husband and wife dance team, traveling around the country as part of a revue. The revue gets picked up and taken to New York City, to be on Broadway. However, it quickly folds, and the two are forced to look for other employment. They eventually find work in a nightclub, becoming famous.

While performing at the nightclub, Flo becomes entranced by a young, sophisticated millionaire playboy, Winston. Swayed by his sweet words, Flo leaves Benny and finds another dancing partner, who she pairs with in another revue, this one financed by Winston. However, her new act is a flop, and when Winston offers to take her to Europe but is unwilling to marry her, she realizes the mistake she's made. She repents and returns to Benny, who takes her back and re-establishes their act, going back on the road.

Cast
Barbara Bennett as Fleurette ("Flo")
Bobby Watson as Benny
Ian Hunter as Winston
Morton Downey as Lew
Osgood Perkins as Hummel
Mackenzie Ward as Henry
Verree Teasdale as Rita
Dorothy Lee as Peggy (screen debut)
Fred Waring and the Pennsylvanians as Themselves. Although they had top billing, Waring and his Pennsylvanians only appeared in two scenes.

Songs
"Jericho" – Leo Robin, Richard Myers
"Mine Alone" – Herman Ruby, Richard Myers
"Do Something" – Bud Green, Sammy Stept
"I'll Always Be In Love With You" – Herman Ruby, Bud Green, & Sammy Stept

Production
Syncopation was shot in New York City. It was originally slated to be titled Stepping High.

Reception
When the film opened at the New York Hippodrome, it had a run of two weeks, during which time it broke the records for that theater for a film.

References

Bibliography
 Barrios, Richard. A Song in the Dark: The Birth of the Musical Film. Oxford University Press, 2010.

External links

Syncopation at SilentEra

1929 films
1920s musical comedy-drama films
American musical comedy-drama films
American black-and-white films
Films based on American novels
Films set in New York City
RKO Pictures films
Films directed by Bert Glennon
1929 musical comedy films
1929 drama films
1920s English-language films
1920s American films